Obong Victor Bassey Attah  (born 20 November 1938) was Governor of Akwa Ibom State in Nigeria from 29 May 1999 to 29 May 2007. He was a member of the Board of Trustees of the People's Democratic Party (PDP), but has since joined the All Progressives Congress.

Background

Obong Victor Attah was born on 20 November 1938. 
He completed post-primary education in 1956. He gained a degree from Leeds College of Art and a post graduate diploma in Building Science from Liverpool University in 1965. He won the scholarship to study at Columbia University in New York, where he obtained an MA in Advanced Architectural Design and Planning. He also attended the Kennedy Graduate School of Governance at Harvard University. After completing his education, he practised as an architect in the Caribbean, New York City, and Nigeria.  
He served as the National President of the Nigerian Institute of Architects.

Governor of Akwa Ibom

He was part of the Peoples Democratic Movement led by Shehu Musa Yar'Adua in the aborted Sani Abacha transition program together with politicians such as Atiku Abubakar, Abdullahi Aliyu Sumaila, Magaji Abdullahi, Chuba Okadigbo and Sunday Afolabi. Victor Attah was elected governor of Akwa Ibom in 1999 on the Akwa Ibom PDP platform, and was re-elected in 2003. He was elected Chairman of the Forum of the 36 Governors of Nigeria in 2003.

In 2001, Attah travelled to the United States with as many as 21 people in search of foreign investors. This visit and others produced tangible results.
He promised to improve telecoms, power supply, and air transport infrastructure, and to replicate Silicon Valley in Uyo.
He planned to build an airport in Uyo before he left office in 2007.
He laid the foundation for the establishment of the Akwa Ibom State University of Technology.

Attah ran for the presidential nomination of the Peoples Democratic Party in 2007, but later withdrew.

Later career
Obong Victor Attah retired from politics after losing the PDP candidacy for presidency in 2007. He spent time with his Wife Alison who is suffering from Type 2 Diabetes. 

In March 2008, Victor Attah joined ExecutiveAction, a consultancy that helps firms manage problems in difficult business environments.

Honour 
On November 24, 2018, in a public statement, Governor Udom Emmanuel of Akwa Ibom state, renamed Akwa Ibom International Airport to Victor Attah International Airport, It was named after the ex-governor to honour him for being the founder of the airport while he was in power from 1999 to 2007.

See also
List of Governors of Akwa Ibom State

References

1938 births
Living people
Columbia Graduate School of Architecture, Planning and Preservation alumni
Peoples Democratic Party state governors of Nigeria
Governors of Akwa Ibom State
Alumni of Leeds Arts University
Harvard Kennedy School alumni
All Progressives Congress politicians
Nigerian expatriates in the United States
Founders of Nigerian schools and colleges
University and college founders
20th-century Nigerian architects